Masimba Keen Mambare (born 9 May 1986) is Zimbabwean international footballer who plays as a midfielder for Dynamos and the Zimbabwe national team.

Career

Club
Mambare started his career with second division sides Amabhubhesi and Ziscosteel before joining top tier side Motor Action. He stayed with Motor Action for four years until he departed to join Highlanders in 2012. He left Highlanders two years later as his contract ran out, he subsequently joined Highlanders' rivals Dynamos, on a three-year contract, amidst a legal battle with Highlanders over unpaid bonuses.

International
Mambare has won 11 caps and scored 4 goals for the Zimbabwe national team. His first international goal came against Malawi in the 2013 COSAFA Cup.

Career statistics

International
.

International goals
. Scores and results list Zimbabwe's goal tally first.

Honours

Club
Motor Action
 Zimbabwe Premier Soccer League (1): 2010

Highlanders
 Mbada Diamonds Cup (1): 2013

Dynamos
 Zimbabwe Premier Soccer League (1): 2014

References

1986 births
Living people
Zimbabwean footballers
Zimbabwe international footballers
Association football midfielders
Motor Action F.C. players
Highlanders F.C. players
2014 African Nations Championship players
Zimbabwe A' international footballers